Paddy DeMarco, (February 10, 1928 – December 13, 1997) was a lightweight professional boxer from Brooklyn, New York who took the Lightweight World Championship on March 5, 1954 against Black lightweight boxer Jimmy Carter. His managers included Jimmy Dixon and Cy Crespi. His trainer was Dan Florio.

Early life and career
DeMarco was born in Brooklyn, New York, on February 10, 1928. He was raised there and considered it his hometown.

DeMarco won his first five professional fights in 1945, losing for the first time against Butch Charles in October of the same year. It was on the 10th of that month that DeMarco fought the legendary Willie Pep, whose record was an unbelievable 131-1-1 at the time. DeMarco lost the unanimous ten round decision, one of very few early setbacks.

On March 4, 1949, he defeated 1989 Boxing Hall of Famer Billy Graham in a somewhat close, rather uneventful ten round unanimous decision before 8,493 at New York's Madison Square Garden. DeMarco piled up a big lead in points in the early rounds in a match that the Associated Press scored six to four for DeMarco.

Three bouts with Featherweight Champ Sandy Saddler, 1949–1951
Many consider his bouts with Sandy Saddler his best. They met three times, with DeMarco impressively winning two of the three bouts. On August 27, 1951, DeMarco beat Saddler, the reigning World Featherweight Champion, in a ten round split decision at the Arena in Milwaukee, Wisconsin. Though he left the ring with his nose bleeding, DeMarco was the clear winner, firing with both hands, and pushing his opponent into the ropes. The bout saw no knockdowns.

DeMarco also beat Saddler on December 7, 1951 before 5,635, in another ten round split decision, this time at Madison Square Garden, boxing's New York cathedral. The United Press, believing he dominated gave DeMarco seven rounds with only three for Saddler. In the fifth, DeMarco clearly showed his superiority over his opponent, who was making a return to the ring after a two-month suspension. The bout saw a great deal of clinching and had both participants warned more than once for using tactics more common to wrestling than boxing matches. Saddler complained bitterly after the bout, believing he was the clear winner.

In his first meeting with Saddler before 13,071 on October 28, 1949, DeMarco lost at Madison Square Garden on a ninth round TKO. Saddler lost the first three rounds on points, and then bored in and demolished his opponent. In the fourth round, Saddler made a mess of DeMarco's face, and continued to gain on points throughout the end of the eighth, when DeMarco's handlers signaled to the referee to end the bout.

Important early career bouts
On December 22, 1949, DeMarco defeated Teddy Davis before 2,500 at the Broadway Arena in Brooklyn in an eight round unanimous decision. DeMarco lost to Davis on August 2, 1950 in a ten round points decision at the Crystal Arena in Norwolk, Connecticut. In a close bout the referee gave Davis three rounds, Demarco two, with five even.

On February 1, 1950 DeMarco defeated Cuban lightweight contender Orlando Zulueta for the only time in a ten round unanimous decision at St. Nicholas Arena in New York. He lost to Zulueta on two other occasions in close ten round decisions at Eastern Parkway Arena in Brooklyn, first on October 27, 1952, and again on September 21, 1953.

On September 24, 1951, DeMarco defeated Enrique Bolanos at the Coliseum in Chicago in a ten round unanimous decision. In a decisive victory, one judge gave DeMarco every round, and one round was the most any of the decision makers gave Bolanos in a bout where DeMarco took the offensive from the opening round.  There were no knockdowns in the bout.

DeMarco first defeated Henry Davis comfortably in a ten round unanimous decision at Madison Square Garden on November 21, 1952. The AP gave seven rounds to DeMarco with only three to Davis. The crowd of 3,418 was not thrilled with the match as the only knockdown came in the third from Davis, and it may have been an accidental slip.  DeMarco beat Davis again on March 14, 1953 at Boston Garden in another ten round unanimous decision. In a decisive win, both of Davis's eyes were nearly closed from swelling by the end of the bout.

Taking the World Lightweight Championship, March 1954
In 1954, DeMarco twice challenged Black boxer and reigning World Lightweight Champion Jimmy Carter for the Lightweight Championship of the World. He won the first meeting on March 5, 1954, in a fifteen round unanimous decision at Madison Square Garden. In a major upset, that saw him as a 4-1 underdog in the early betting, DeMarco won the bout decisively on points and took the world title. In the first two rounds, DeMarco gained a lead on points with close range jabs, hooks, and body punching. Though losing the fourteenth round, DeMarco dominated on points particularly from the sixth and subsequent rounds where he clearly looked the winner.

Losing the World Lightweight Championship, November 1954
In his first defense of the World Lightweight Championship, DeMarco lost the title November 17, 1954 to Jimmy Carter in a fifteen round TKO in Daley, California before 11,000 frantic fans. In the brutal and savage bout, the referee stopped the fighting in the final round, with DeMarco virtually out on his feet, his left eye nearly swollen shut, and his cheek rapidly turning a dark blue. Carter had DeMarco down on the mat twice, once for a four count from a left hook to the chin in the ninth and once in the fourteenth.

On October 3, 1955, though an underdog in the early betting, DeMarco defeated lightweight contender Kenny Lane in a ten round split decision at the St. Nicholas Arena in New York. DeMarco hit and held repeatedly in the bout, where clutching was common, and even threw in a few headbutts for good measure. There was little in decisive punching as Lane's southpaw stance and DeMarco's constant clutching threw off the timing of both boxers.

DeMarco's last fight was in November 1959. He retired with a career record of 75 wins (8 by knockout, 26 losses, and 3 draws). DeMarco died in Salt Lake City, Utah on December 13, 1997.

Professional boxing record

Boxing achievements

See also
Lineal championship
List of lightweight boxing champions

Notes

External links
 
https://boxrec.com/media/index.php/National_Boxing_Association%27s_Quarterly_Ratings:_1954
 https://titlehistories.com/boxing/na/usa/ny/nysac-l.html

1928 births
American people of Italian descent
Boxers from New York (state)
World lightweight boxing champions
World boxing champions
Lightweight boxers
1997 deaths
American male boxers